Falmouth is a locality and small rural community in the local government area of Break O'Day, in the North-east region of Tasmania. The Tasman Sea forms most of its eastern boundary, with the remainder being the centre line of Henderson Lagoon. The 2016 census determined a population of 102 for the state suburb of Falmouth.

History
The locality name is believed to be derived from Falmouth, a seaport in Cornwall, England.

Road infrastructure
The Tasman Highway passes through from south to north, and intersects with the Esk Highway within the locality.

Notable people
 Val Schier, Australian politician

References

Localities of Break O'Day Council
Towns in Tasmania